NewMediaRockstars (NMR) was an online magazine which was launched in December 2011 and primarily covered YouTube performers, entrepreneurs, and artists with videos and interviews. In 2013, NewMediaRockstars closed because of lack of funding, but was subsequently acquired by Danny Zappin (former CEO of Maker Studios) with the aim of building an online entertainment weekly. In 2014, Filup Molina took over all operations for NewMediaRockstars and rebranded the company as NewRockstars. The company switched focus to film and television analysis and the company's YouTube channel became its primary publication platform.

History
The online magazine was started by Benny Luo towards the end of 2011.  At that time, the stated aim was to cover new media primarily on YouTube. In August, 2013, NewMediaRockstars''' investor pulled funding and it had to shut down. Two months later, in October 2013, the online magazine was acquired by Danny Zappin.  His goal in acquiring it was to broaden its coverage of new media.

Content
When Danny Zappin acquired NewMediaRockstars in 2013, his stated aim was to make the magazine the leader in covering new media: "The plan is to broaden NMRs business model so that it can be to new media and online video what Entertainment Weekly was to the film, TV, and book business when EW launched in the early 1990s."  In 2014, screenwriter and producer, Rory Haines was appointed CEO with the aim of expanding NMR'' into producing more video content.

References

External links
 

Mass media companies established in 2011
Mass media companies of the United States
American companies established in 2011